Marjorie Carpréaux (born 17 September 1987) is a Belgian basketball player for Declercq Stortbeton Waregem BC and the Belgian national team.

She participated at the EuroBasket Women 2017. She is openly lesbian.

References

External links
 
 Marjorie Carpréaux at Eurobasket.com
 
 
 

1987 births
Living people
Belgian women's basketball players
Olympic basketball players of Belgium
Basketball players at the 2020 Summer Olympics
Belgian expatriate basketball people in France
Belgian expatriate basketball people in Italy
Belgian expatriate basketball people in Sweden
People from Boussu
Point guards
Belgian lesbians
Belgium LGBT sportspeople
Sportspeople from Hainaut (province)